Lindquist & Vennum LLP was a law firm of approximately 170 attorneys that provided corporate finance, transactional and litigation services for clients from offices in Minnesota, Colorado, and South Dakota. The firm was formed in 1968 when Lindquist, Magnuson & Glennon combined with Vennum, Newhall, Ackman & Goetz. As of January 1, 2018, the firm merged with and took the name of Ballard Spahr.

Departments
The firm's Corporate and Transactional Services department included the following  practices:

Mergers and Acquisitions
Financial Restructuring and Bankruptcy
Private Equity
Real Estate
Financial Institutions
Trusts and Estates
Capital Markets
Emerging Companies and Private Capital
Employee Benefits and Executive Compensation
Energy Generation and Transmission
Environment, Land, and Natural Resources
Health Law
Information Technology, Internet, and E-commerce
Insurance Services
International Law
Nonprofit and Foundations
Regulatory and Public Law
Tax
Venture Capital

The firm's Litigation and Dispute Resolution department included the following  practices:

Commercial Litigation
Alternative Dispute Resolution (ADR)
Securities and Financial Litigation
Real Estate and Construction Litigation
Antitrust
Intellectual Property
Insurance Recovery
Appellate Law
Employment Litigation
Family Business Disputes
Fiduciary Litigation
Franchise & Distribution
Product Liability
Shareholder Disputes
White-Collar Crime
Family Law

Teams
Industry and Specialty Teams at the firm included:

Agribusiness and Co-ops
Biofuels
Energy
Food Production and Agriculture
Hospitality
Life Sciences and Medical Technology
Oil and Gas

Commitment to community service and pro bono
Since 1997, Lindquist & Vennum has achieved 100 percent pro bono participation by its partners, associates and paralegals. In 2007, the firm was first to be honored for its pro bono efforts by the Minnesota Judicial Council, a newly formed policy-making body of the Minnesota Judicial Branch. In 2013, the firm was named to The National Law Journal's Pro Bono Hot List.

References

External links
 http://www.law.com/jsp/nlj/PubArticleNLJ.jsp?id=1202583255373&germane=1202583307764 Lindquist & Vennum named to Pro Bono Hot List

1968 establishments in Minnesota
Law firms based in Minneapolis
Defunct law firms of the United States